Bakpinka, or Iyongiyong (a name shared with Kiong), is an endangered Upper Cross River language of Nigeria.

References

Languages of Nigeria
Upper Cross River languages